Hippomane is a genus of plants in the Euphorbiaceae described by Linnaeus in 1753. It is native to the West Indies, Central America, Mexico, Florida, Venezuela, Colombia, and Galápagos.

Derivation of name
The name of the genus references the Greek name hippomanes (applied by Theophrastus to an unidentified plant said to poison horses, sending them mad) - this being a compound of the Greek elements ἵππος (= ) horse and μανία (= mania) insanity / frenzy - hence "sending horses insane".

Species
Accepted Species
 Hippomane horrida Urb. & Ekman. - Barahona in Dominican Rep
 Hippomane mancinella L. - West Indies, Mexico, Central America, Florida Keys, Venezuela, Colombia, Galápagos
 Hippomane spinosa L. - Hispaniola

Species formerly included
moved to other genera: Sapium

References

Hippomaneae
Euphorbiaceae genera
Taxa named by Carl Linnaeus
Neotropical realm flora